The men's tournament competition of the beach volleyball events at the 2019 Pan American Games will take place between 24-30 of July at the Estadio de Volley de Playa a temporary venue in the San Miguel cluster. The defending Pan American Games champions are Rodolfo Ontiveros and Juan Virgen of Mexico.

Each of the 16 pairs in the tournament were placed in one of four groups of four teams apiece, and play a round-robin within that pool. The top two teams in each pool advanced to the quarterfinals. The third along with the fourth-placed teams in each group, were eliminated.

The 8 teams that advanced to the elimination rounds played a single-elimination tournament with a bronze medal match between the semifinal losers.

Schedule

Results 
All times are local, PET (UTC−5).

Preliminary round

Group A

Group B

Group C

Group D

Placement 13th–16th

13th–16th semifinals

15th–16th place match

13th–14th place match

Placement 9th–12th

9th–12th semifinals

11th–12th place match

9th–10th place match

Placement 5th–8th

5th–8th semifinals

7th–8th place match

5th–6th place match

Placement 1st–4th

Quarterfinals qualifying
Losers of Quarterfinals qualifying are transferred to Placement 9th–12th.

Quarterfinals
Losers of Quarterfinals are transferred to Placement 5th–8th.

Semifinals

Bronze medal match

Gold medal match

Final standings

References 

Men